Probable G-protein coupled receptor 52 is a protein that in humans is encoded by the GPR52 gene.

Members of the G protein-coupled receptor (GPR) family play important roles in signal transduction from the external environment to the inside of the cell.[supplied by OMIM]

Cannabidiol, CBD, and O-1918 are Inverse agonist at GPR52

References

Further reading

G protein-coupled receptors